Shelley L. Berger is the Daniel S. Och Professor of cell and developmental biology at the University of Pennsylvania School of Medicine. Her research focuses on epigenetics.

Education and career 
Berger graduated from the University of Michigan Ann Arbor with a BS in biology in 1982 and a PhD in cell and molecular biology in 1987. She did a postdoctoral fellowship at MIT. Prior to joining the University of Pennsylvania faculty, she was the Hilary Koprowski Professor at the Wistar Institute in Philadelphia.

Awards 
 Elected fellow of the American Association for Advancement of Science
 Elected member of the National Academy of Medicine
 Elected member of American Academy of Arts and Sciences
 2018 Elected member of the National Academy of Sciences

References

External links 
 

Members of the United States National Academy of Sciences
Members of the National Academy of Medicine
University of Pennsylvania faculty
University of Pennsylvania Department of Biology faculty
American geneticists
American women geneticists
20th-century American scientists
20th-century American women scientists
21st-century American scientists
21st-century American women scientists
University of Michigan College of Literature, Science, and the Arts alumni
Massachusetts Institute of Technology fellows
Fellows of the American Association for the Advancement of Science
Living people
Year of birth missing (living people)
American women academics